Kuwait is a sovereign emirate located on the coast of the Persian Gulf in Southwest Asia and the Middle East.  Kuwait is bordered by Saudi Arabia to the south and Iraq to the north and west.  The name of Kuwait is a diminutive of an Arabic word meaning "fortress built near water." It has a population of 4.1 million and an area of 17,818 km2. Kuwait is a constitutional monarchy with a parliamentary system of government and Kuwait City serves as its political and economic capital.

General reference 

 Pronunciation: ; Kuwaiti Arabic: ; Literary Arabic: 
 Common English country name: Kuwait
 Official English country name:  The State of Kuwait
 Common endonym(s): List of countries and capitals in native languages
 Official endonym(s): List of official endonyms of present-day nations and states
 Adjectival(s): Kuwaiti
 Demonym(s):
 Etymology: Name of Kuwait
 International rankings of Kuwait
 ISO country codes:  KW, KWT, 414
 ISO region codes:  See ISO 3166-2:KW
 Internet country code top-level domain: .kw

Geography of Kuwait 

Geography of Kuwait
 Kuwait is: a country
 Location:
 Northern Hemisphere and Eastern Hemisphere
 Eurasia
 Asia
 Southwest Asia
 Middle East
 Arabian Peninsula
 Time zone: UTC+03
 Extreme points of Kuwait
 High:  unnamed location 
 Low: Persian Gulf 0 m
 Land boundaries:  462 km
 240 km
 222 km
 Coastline: Persian Gulf 499 km
 PopulationPopulation of Kuwait of Kuwait: 2,851,000  - 136th most populous country
 AreaArea of Kuwait of Kuwait: 17,818 km2
 Atlas of Kuwait

Environment of Kuwait 

Environmental issues in Kuwait
 Climate of Kuwait
 Renewable energy in Kuwait
 Geology of Kuwait
 Protected areas of Kuwait
 Biosphere reserves in Kuwait
 National parks of Kuwait
 Birds of Kuwait
 Mammals of Kuwait

Natural geographic features of Kuwait 

 Bays of Kuwait
 Kuwait Bay
 Islands of Kuwait
 Lakes of Kuwait: None
 Mountains of Kuwait
 Volcanoes of Kuwait:None
 Rivers of Kuwait
 Waterfalls of Kuwait: None
 Valleys of Kuwait:None

Regions of Kuwait 

Regions of Kuwait

Ecoregions of Kuwait 

List of ecoregions in Kuwait

Administrative divisions of Kuwait 

Administrative divisions of Kuwait
 Governorates of Kuwait
 Areas of Kuwait

Governorates of Kuwait 

Governorates of Kuwait
 Areas of Kuwait

Districts of Kuwait 

Districts of Kuwait

Municipalities of Kuwait 

 Capital of Kuwait: Kuwait City

Demography of Kuwait 

Demographics of Kuwait

Government and politics of Kuwait 

Politics of Kuwait
 Form of government:constitutional monarchy
 Capital of Kuwait: Kuwait City
 Elections in Kuwait
 Political parties in Kuwait

Branches of the government of Kuwait 

Government of Kuwait

Executive branch of the government of Kuwait 
 Head of state: Emir of Kuwait,
 Head of government: Prime Minister of Kuwait,
 Cabinet of Kuwait

Legislative branch of the government of Kuwait 

 National Assembly (unicameral)

Judicial branch of the government of Kuwait 

Court system of Kuwait
 Supreme Court of Kuwait

Foreign relations of Kuwait 

Foreign relations of Kuwait
 Diplomatic missions in Kuwait
 Diplomatic missions of Kuwait
 Iraq–Kuwait relations

International organization membership 
The State of Kuwait is a member of:

African Development Bank Group (AfDB) (nonregional member)
Arab Bank for Economic Development in Africa (ABEDA)
Arab Fund for Economic and Social Development (AFESD)
Arab Monetary Fund (AMF)
Cooperation Council for the Arab States of the Gulf (GCC)
Council of Arab Economic Unity (CAEU)
Development Bank of Central African States (BDEAC)
Food and Agriculture Organization (FAO)
Group of 77 (G77)
International Atomic Energy Agency (IAEA)
International Bank for Reconstruction and Development (IBRD)
International Chamber of Commerce (ICC)
International Civil Aviation Organization (ICAO)
International Criminal Court (ICCt) (signatory)
International Criminal Police Organization (Interpol)
International Development Association (IDA)
International Federation of Red Cross and Red Crescent Societies (IFRCS)
International Finance Corporation (IFC)
International Fund for Agricultural Development (IFAD)
International Hydrographic Organization (IHO)
International Labour Organization (ILO)
International Maritime Organization (IMO)
International Mobile Satellite Organization (IMSO)
International Monetary Fund (IMF)
International Olympic Committee (IOC)
International Organization for Standardization (ISO)
International Red Cross and Red Crescent Movement (ICRM)

International Telecommunication Union (ITU)
International Telecommunications Satellite Organization (ITSO)
International Trade Union Confederation (ITUC)
Inter-Parliamentary Union (IPU)
Islamic Development Bank (IDB)
League of Arab States (LAS)
Multilateral Investment Guarantee Agency (MIGA)
Nonaligned Movement (NAM)
Organisation of Islamic Cooperation (OIC)
Organisation for the Prohibition of Chemical Weapons (OPCW)
Organization of Arab Petroleum Exporting Countries (OAPEC)
Organization of Petroleum Exporting Countries (OPEC)
Permanent Court of Arbitration (PCA)
United Nations (UN)
United Nations Conference on Trade and Development (UNCTAD)
United Nations Educational, Scientific, and Cultural Organization (UNESCO)
United Nations Industrial Development Organization (UNIDO)
United Nations Institute for Training and Research (UNITAR)
Universal Postal Union (UPU)
World Customs Organization (WCO)
World Federation of Trade Unions (WFTU)
World Health Organization (WHO)
World Intellectual Property Organization (WIPO)
World Meteorological Organization (WMO)
World Tourism Organization (UNWTO)
World Trade Organization (WTO)

Law and order in Kuwait 
 Constitution of Kuwait
 Crime in Kuwait
 Corruption in Kuwait
 Human trafficking in Kuwait
 Terrorism in Kuwait
 Human rights in Kuwait
 LGBT rights in Kuwait
 Freedom of religion in Kuwait
 Law enforcement in Kuwait
 Kuwait Police
 Legal system of Kuwait

Military of Kuwait 

Military of Kuwait
 Command
 Commander-in-chief:
 Ministry of Defence of Kuwait
 Forces
 Army of Kuwait
 Navy of Kuwait
 Air Force of Kuwait
 Kuwait National Guard
 Military ranks of Kuwait

Local government in Kuwait 

Local government in Kuwait

History of Kuwait 

History of Kuwait

Culture of Kuwait 

Culture of Kuwait
 Architecture of Kuwait
 List of tallest buildings in Kuwait
 Cuisine of Kuwait
 Festivals in Kuwait
 Languages of Kuwait
 Kuwaiti Arabic
 Kuwaiti Persian
 Coat of arms of Kuwait
 Flag of Kuwait
 Media in Kuwait
 Newspapers in Kuwait
 Television in Kuwait
 National anthem of Kuwait
 People of Kuwait
 Prostitution in Kuwait
 Public holidays in Kuwait
 Records of Kuwait
 Religion in Kuwait
 Buddhism in Kuwait
 Christianity in Kuwait
 Hinduism in Kuwait
 Islam in Kuwait
 World Heritage Sites in Kuwait: None

Art in Kuwait 
 Art of Kuwait
 Cinema of Kuwait
 Literature of Kuwait
 Music of Kuwait
 Theater of Kuwait

Sports in Kuwait 

Sports in Kuwait
 Football in Kuwait
 Kuwait at the Olympics

Economy and infrastructure of Kuwait 

Economy of Kuwait
 Economic rank, by nominal GDP (2007): 53rd (fifty-third)
 Agriculture in Kuwait
 Banking in Kuwait
 National Bank of Kuwait
 Kuwait Finance House
 Communications in Kuwait
 Internet in Kuwait
 Companies of Kuwait
Currency of Kuwait: Dinar
ISO 4217: KWD
 Energy in Kuwait
 Energy policy of Kuwait
 Petroleum industry in Kuwait
 Healthcare in Kuwait
 Health in Kuwait
 Mining in Kuwait
 Kuwait Stock Exchange
 Tourism in Kuwait
 Visa policy of Kuwait
 Transport in Kuwait
 Airports in Kuwait
 Rail transport in Kuwait
 Roads in Kuwait

Education in Kuwait 

Education in Kuwait
 Coeducation in Kuwait

See also 

Kuwait
 
Index of Kuwait-related articles
List of international rankings
List of Kuwait-related topics
Member state of the United Nations
Outline of Asia
Outline of geography

References

 Kuwait People Management System(KPIMS) http://clubco.dyndns.org/kpims

External links

 
 
 The Office of the Amir of Kuwait
 

Kuwait